In mathematics, a base (or basis) for the topology  of a topological space  is a family  of open subsets of  such that every open set of the topology is equal to the union of some sub-family of .  For example, the set of all open intervals in the real number line  is a basis for the Euclidean topology on  because every open interval is an open set, and also every open subset of  can be written as a union of some family of open intervals.

Bases are ubiquitous throughout topology. The sets in a base for a topology, which are called , are often easier to describe and use than arbitrary open sets. Many important topological definitions such as continuity and convergence can be checked using only basic open sets instead of arbitrary open sets. Some topologies have a base of open sets with specific useful properties that may make checking such topological definitions easier.

Such families of sets are very frequently used to define topologies. A weaker notion related to bases is that of a subbase for a topology. Bases for topologies are also closely related to neighborhood bases.

Definition and basic properties

For example, the collection of all open intervals in the real line forms a base for the standard topology on the real numbers.  More generally, in a metric space  the collection of all open balls about points of  forms a base for the topology.

In general, a topological space  can have many bases. The whole topology  is always a base for itself (that is,  is a base for ). For the real line, the collection of all open intervals is a base for the topology. So is the collection of all open intervals with rational endpoints, or the collection of all open intervals with irrational endpoints, for example. Note that two different bases need not have any basic open set in common. From the examples above, the real line has countable weight.

If  is a base for the topology  of a space , it satisfies the following properties:
(B2) For every  and every point , there exists some  such that .
Property (B1) corresponds to the fact that  is an open set; property (B2) corresponds to the fact that  is an open set.

Then  is a base for the topology that it generates.
Such families of sets are a very common way of defining a topology.

(This topology is the intersection of all topologies on  containing .) (See the article about subbase.)

There is often an easy way to check condition (B2). For example, the Euclidean topology on the plane admits as a base the set of all open rectangles with horizontal and vertical sides, and a nonempty intersection of two such basic open sets is also a basic open set. But another base for the same topology is the collection of all open disks; and here the full (B2) condition is necessary.

The topology generated by  contains all open intervals , hence  generates the standard topology on the real line.

Examples

By definition, every σ-algebra, every filter (and so in particular, every neighborhood filter), and every topology is a covering -system and so also a base for a topology. A base for a topology does not have to be closed under finite intersections and many aren't. But nevertheless, many topologies are defined by bases that are also closed under finite intersections.
In fact, it is strictly coarser because  contains non-empty compact sets which are never open in the Euclidean topology. 

Objects defined in terms of bases

 The order topology on a totally ordered set admits a collection of open-interval-like sets as a base.
 In a metric space the collection of all open balls forms a base for the topology.
 The discrete topology has the collection of all singletons as a base.
 A second-countable space is one that has a countable base.

The Zariski topology on the spectrum of a ring has a base consisting of open sets that have specific useful properties. For the usual base for this topology, every finite intersection of basic open sets is a basic open set.

It has a base formed by the set complements of algebraic hypersurfaces. 
 The Zariski topology of the spectrum of a ring (the set of the prime ideals) has a base such that each element consists of all prime ideals that do not contain a given element of the ring.

Theorems

 If  are bases for the topologies  then the collection of all set products  with each  is a base for the product topology  In the case of an infinite product, this still applies, except that all but finitely many of the base elements must be the entire space.

Base for the closed sets

Closed sets are equally adept at describing the topology of a space. There is, therefore, a dual notion of a base for the closed sets of a topological space. Given a topological space  a family  of closed sets forms a base for the closed sets if and only if for each closed set  and each point  not in  there exists an element of  containing  but not containing 

Let  be a base for the closed sets of  Then

Any collection of subsets of a set  satisfying these properties forms a base for the closed sets of a topology on  The closed sets of this topology are precisely the intersections of members of 

In some cases it is more convenient to use a base for the closed sets rather than the open ones. For example, a space is completely regular if and only if the zero sets form a base for the closed sets. Given any topological space  the zero sets form the base for the closed sets of some topology on  This topology will be the finest completely regular topology on  coarser than the original one. In a similar vein, the Zariski topology on An is defined by taking the zero sets of polynomial functions as a base for the closed sets.

Weight and character

Fix X a topological space.

We define the weight, w(X), as the minimum cardinality of a basis; we define the network weight, nw(X), as the minimum cardinality of a network; the character of a point,  as the minimum cardinality of a neighbourhood basis for x in X; and the character of X to be

The point of computing the character and weight is to be able to tell what sort of bases and local bases can exist. We have the following facts:

 nw(X) ≤ w(X).
 if X is discrete, then w(X) = nw(X) = |X|.
 if X is Hausdorff, then nw(X) is finite if and only if X is finite discrete.
 if B is a basis of X then there is a basis  of size 
 if N a neighbourhood basis for x in X then there is a neighbourhood basis  of size 
 if  is a continuous surjection, then nw(Y) ≤ w(X). (Simply consider the Y-network  for each basis B of X.)
 if  is Hausdorff, then there exists a weaker Hausdorff topology  so that  So a fortiori, if X is also compact, then such topologies coincide and hence we have, combined with the first fact, nw(X) = w(X).
 if  a continuous surjective map from a compact metrizable space to an Hausdorff space, then Y is compact metrizable.

The last fact follows from f(X) being compact Hausdorff, and hence  (since compact metrizable spaces are necessarily second countable); as well as the fact that compact Hausdorff spaces are metrizable exactly in case they are second countable. (An application of this, for instance, is that every path in a Hausdorff space is compact metrizable.)

Increasing chains of open sets
Using the above notation, suppose that w(X) ≤ κ some infinite cardinal. Then there does not exist a strictly increasing sequence of open sets (equivalently strictly decreasing sequence of closed sets) of length ≥ κ+.

To see this (without the axiom of choice), fix

as a basis of open sets. And suppose per contra, that

were a strictly increasing sequence of open sets. This means

For

we may use the basis to find some Uγ with x in Uγ ⊆ Vα. In this way we may well-define a map, f : κ+ → κ mapping each α to the least γ for which Uγ ⊆ Vα and meets

This map is injective, otherwise there would be α < β with f(α) = f(β) = γ, which would further imply Uγ ⊆ Vα but also meets

which is a contradiction. But this would go to show that κ+ ≤ κ, a contradiction.

See also

 Esenin-Volpin's theorem
 Gluing axiom
 Neighbourhood system

Notes

References

Bibliography

  
 
  
  
 
  

General topology